Georgios Dragovits (born ) is a retired Greek male volleyball player. He was part of the Greece men's national volleyball team that won the bronze medal at the 1987 European Championship in Belgium. He was also part of the Greek team at the 1994 FIVB Volleyball Men's World Championship in Greece and the 2002 FIVB Volleyball Men's World Championship in Argentina. He played for Olympiacos for 15 years (1987-2001, 2004-2005) winning two CEV Cup Winners' Cup / CEV Cups (1996, 2005) and numerous domestic titles.

References

External links
 profile at fivb.org

1968 births
Living people
Greek men's volleyball players
Olympiacos S.C. players
Place of birth missing (living people)